Robert Lance Barksdale (born March 8, 1967) is an American umpire in Major League Baseball (MLB). He began umpiring in the major leagues in 2000 and joined the full-time major league staff in 2006. Barksdale was promoted to crew chief in 2023.

Umpiring career
His minor league service included the Appalachian League, the South Atlantic League, the Florida State League, the Florida Instructional League, the Southern League, the Pacific Coast League, the Arizona Fall League and the International League. 

Barksdale served as a major league fill-in umpire between 2000 and his full-time MLB promotion in 2006. He was added to crew Q, led by Dale Scott, when he was called up permanently.

Barksdale was the home plate umpire when Randy Johnson struck out 20 Cincinnati Reds batters at Bank One Ballpark on May 8, 2001.

Barksdale was at first base on August 7, 2004, for Greg Maddux's 300th win and also at first base on June 1, 2012, when Johan Santana threw a no-hitter. He has also umpired in the World Baseball Classic in 2009 and 2013, the Major League Baseball All-Star Game in 2012 and 2022, the Wild Card Game in 2013, 2017 and 2020, the Division Series in 2014, 2015, 2018, 2019 and 2022, the Championship Series in 2017, 2020 and 2021 and the World Series in 2019 and 2022.

Barksdale was the third base umpire for Henderson Alvarez's no-hitter on September 29, 2013. 

Barksdale was the home plate umpire when Wade Miley of the Cincinnati Reds threw a no hitter against the Cleveland Indians on May 7, 2021.

Personal life
He lives in Mississippi with his wife and two children.

See also 
 List of Major League Baseball umpires

References

External links
 MLB.com profile
 The Baseball Cube
 Retrosheet

1967 births
Living people
Major League Baseball umpires
People from Brookhaven, Mississippi
Mississippi College alumni